Natal teeth are teeth that are present above the gumline (have already erupted) at birth, and neonatal teeth are teeth that emerge through the gingiva during the first month of life (the neonatal period).

The incidence of neonatal teeth varies considerably, between 1:700 and 1:30,000 depending on the type of study; the highest prevalence is found in the only study that relies on personal examination of patients.

Natal teeth, and neonatal teeth, can be the baby's normal deciduous teeth, sprouting prematurely. These should be preserved, if possible.  Alternately, they could be supernumary teeth, extra teeth, not part of the normal allotment of teeth.

Signs and symptoms
Most often natal teeth are mandibular central incisors. They have little root structure and are attached to the end of the gum by soft tissue and are often mobile.

Causes
Most of the time, natal teeth are not related to a medical condition. However, sometimes they may be associated with:
 Ellis–van Creveld syndrome
 Hallermann–Streiff syndrome
 Pierre Robin syndrome
 Sotos syndrome

Treatment
No intervention is usually recommended unless they are causing difficulty to the infant or mother.

However some recommend that they be removed as the tooth can cut or amputate the tip of the tongue.

They should be left in the mouth as long as possible to decrease the likelihood of removing permanent tooth buds with the natal tooth. They should also not be removed if the infant has hypoprothrombinemia. In case of complications when the natal teeth need to be removed, dental radiographs should be obtained whenever possible, and evaluated and followed up with pediatric dentists.

Notable cases
Napoleon Bonaparte
Louis XIV
Richard III
Ivan the Terrible
Kate Mulgrew
 Honoré Gabriel Riqueti, comte de Mirabeau
 Cardinal Mazarin
 Cardinal Richelieu
 Zoroaster
 Hannibal

References

External links 

Neonatology
Types of teeth
Congenital disorders
Human mouth anatomy